Thein Htay was the former Minister for Border Affairs and Minister for Industrial Development of Myanmar (Burma). He was reassigned to the Myanmar Army in February 2013, as the head of the Directorate of Defense Industries (DDI)  carrying the rank of lieutenant general.

References

Government ministers of Myanmar
Burmese military personnel
1955 births
People from Shan State
Living people
Union Solidarity and Development Party politicians